Tim Berbenich (born December 19, 1979) is an American football coach who is currently the tight ends coach for the Houston Texans of the National Football League (NFL).

Coaching career

New York Jets 
Berbenich began his career with the New York Jets in their operations office before transitioning to an offensive assistant position.

Tampa Bay Buccaneers 
Berbenich moved on as an offensive quality control coach for the Tampa Bay Buccaneers, working under former Jets offensive coordinator Paul Hackett, who was the Buccaneers quarterbacks coach at the time.

Indianapolis Colts 
Berbenich was hired as an offensive assistant for the Indianapolis Colts in 2013 working under offensive coordinator Pep Hamilton, who he shared an office with when they were with the Jets. He was promoted to assistant quarterbacks coach in 2016.

Oakland / Las Vegas Raiders 
Berbenich was hired as an offensive quality control coach for the Oakland Raiders in 2018, reuniting with Gruden. He was promoted to running backs coach in 2021 after Kirby Wilson announced his retirement.

Houston Texans 
Berbenich was hired as an tight ends coach for the Houston Texans on February 21, 2022.

References

External links 
 Las Vegas Raiders profile

1979 births
Living people
People from Huntington, New York
Players of American football from New York (state)
Coaches of American football from New York (state)
American football wide receivers
Hamilton Continentals football players
New York Jets coaches
Tampa Bay Buccaneers coaches
Indianapolis Colts coaches
Oakland Raiders coaches
Las Vegas Raiders coaches
Houston Texans coaches